Teesh and Trude is a 2002 Australian drama film directed by New Zealander Melanie Rodriga, and was adapted from an original stage-play by Wilson McCaskill. The film was produced and shot entirely in Western Australia with Production Investment Funding Support from ScreenWest and Lotterywest. It was shot on video at Murdoch University where Rodriga teaches.

The film received three nominations at the Australian Film Institute Awards in 2003 and one at the Film Critics Circle of Australia Awards.

Plot
Teesh (Susie Porter), an unemployed single mother in her twenties, shares a flat with an older, divorced friend, Trude (Linda Cropper). Teesh is starting to crack under the strain of taking care of her son Kenny (Mason Richardson) and her problems only get worse when her abusive father (Bill McClusky), who's just been released from prison, visits.

Trude is also having problems with her macho boyfriend Rod (Peter Phelps), who must complete a major paving contract at the shopping mall to save his ailing construction company. Meanwhile, Trude pines after her own children, who are apparently living with their father in a different state.

Cast
 Susie Porter as Letitia (Teesh)
 Linda Cropper as Trudy (Trude)
 Jacob Allan as Les
 Peter Phelps as Rod
 Bill McClusky as Bob
 Mason Richardson as Kenny 
 Igor Sas as Gary 
 Kazimir Sas as Craig 
 Francoise Sas as Lelia 
 Adam Crouch as Wes

Critical reception 
The Age wrote, "Not since Mallboy has there been a local drama as depressing as this." It added that, "It isn't Ken Loach or Mike Leigh but it's in that ambit and the acting is very gritty."

Urban Cinefile said that "This may not be the worst local film of the year, but at 93 minutes it still seems to last forever."

David Stratton said "The film was obviously produced on the most minimal budget, and its theatrical origins are very obvious, but, despite these limitations, the film impresses because of the excellent acting."

See also
 Cinema of Australia

References

External links

Teesh and Trude @  Screen Australia (formerly Australian Film Commission)

2002 films
Australian drama films
2002 drama films
2000s English-language films
2000s Australian films